Poland competed at the 1988 Summer Paralympics in Seoul, South Korea. 47 competitors from Poland won 81 medals including 23 gold, 25 silver and 33 bronze and finished 9th in the medal table.

See also 
 Poland at the Paralympics
 Poland at the 1988 Summer Olympics

References 

Poland at the Paralympics
1988 in Polish sport
Nations at the 1988 Summer Paralympics